Sket is a 2011 British urban retribution thriller film, set in the inner estates of North West London. Released in October 2011, the film comes from the makers of Shank (2010) and Anuvahood (2011). Starring Lily Loveless, Aimee Kelly, Adelayo Adedayo, Emma Hartley-Miller, Slaine Kelly, Varada Sethu and Ashley Walters as the lead stars, the film is the feature-length directorial debut of writer Nirpal Bhogal. Sket was filmed on location in London. The estate where Kayla and her sister live is the Rowley Way Estate near West Hampstead, whilst the girl gang are shown living at the Whittington Estate on Dartmouth Park Hill, with one scene filmed in nearby Chester Road. Both estates are in the borough of Camden. The film premiered at the BFI London Film Festival as part of the "Film on the Square", and was released in cinemas Nationwide on 28 October 2011. The DVD and Blu-ray were released on 5 March 2012.

Plot
Sisters Kayla (Aimee Kelly) and Tanya (Kate Foster-Barnes) move from Newcastle upon Tyne to commence a new life near their estranged father after their mother has died. Kayla is reluctant to reconcile with him. Meanwhile, drug dealer/gang-boss Trey (Ashley Walters) has instructed his female companion Shaks (Riann Steele) to murder a crackhead who has fallen behind on the payments for her drugs.

On her way home from a day of shopping, two youths harass Kayla on the bus. However, she manages to escape from harm after Danielle (Emma Hartley-Miller) and her crew beats them up. After her ordeal, Kayla decides to return home, instead of meeting her sister for a meal in a cafe. As Tanya leaves the cafe, she finds Trey attacking Shaks for not confronting the crackhead and tries to help Shaks. Instead, Trey pounces on Tanya and leaves her in the street to die. Worrying that Kayla will reveal the identity of her sister's killer to the police, Trey sends his men to take her out. Realizing that she is slowly running out of options, Kayla realizes her only hope of survival and revenge is to get in tow with Danielle and her crew, but could her new friendship cost Danielle's life?

Cast
Ashley Walters as Trey
Lily Loveless as Hannah
Riann Steele as Shaks
Aimee Kelly as Kayla
Emma Hartley-Miller as Danielle
Adelayo Adedayo as Kerry
Varada Sethu as Kiran
Richie Campbell as Ruds
Kate Foster-Barnes as Tanya
Michael Maris as Drew
Ashley Chin as Titch
Leon Ajikawo as Reet
Candis Nergaard as Scarred Woman
David Nellist as Kayla's Dad
Marc Sutcliffe as Sparks

External links

Sket at Screen Base
AV Pictures takes on Revolver's girl gang thriller Sket

2011 films
2010s crime films
Black British mass media
Black British films
British crime films
Hood films
British films about revenge
Films shot in London
Films set in London
Gateway Films films
2010s gang films
2010s English-language films
2010s American films
2010s British films